Indecent is a word meaning "inappropriate".

Indecent may also refer to:
Indecent exposure, a deliberate exposure in a public place
Indecent (play), a play by Paula Vogel

See also